The Nordia 2017 Stamp Exhibition was an international stamp exhibition held 27–29 October 2017 at the Spektrum and DGI-Huset in Vejle, Denmark. The exhibition was granted patronage from the Federation of European Philatelic Associations (FEPA).

The event included the 4th International Polar Philatelic Exhibition.

Palmares
The Grand Prix awards went to the following exhibits:

The Grand Prix Nordic went to Klaas Biermann for ‘Norway Coat Of Arms 1855-1868‘ (92 points).

The Grand Prix International went to Per Bunnstad for ‘Albatross: A Dramatic Event during the First World War‘ (92 points).

The Grand Prix National went to Torben Malm for ‘Service Stamps of Denmark, 1871-1924‘ (95 points).

The Polar Grand went to Hugh Osborne for ‘South Georgia Postal History, 1904-1942‘.

References

External links 
 

2017